Prem Kumar is the name of:

 Prem Kumar (Malayalam actor), Indian film actor in Malayalam films
 Prem Kumar (Kannada actor), Indian film actor in Kannada films
 Prem Kumar (footballer) (born 1989), Indian footballer
 Prem Kumar (politician) (born 1960), Indian politician 
 Swami Premananda (guru) (Prem Kumar, 1951–2011), Indian guru
 Prem Kumar: Salesman of the Year, 2018 Odia language film